Space Truckers is a 1996 comic science fiction film directed by Stuart Gordon and starring Dennis Hopper, Stephen Dorff, Debi Mazar and Charles Dance. It was filmed at Ardmore Studios, County Wicklow, Ireland.

The story concerns John Canyon, one of the last independent space transport entrepreneurs. Bad times have forced him to carry suspicious cargo to Earth without asking questions. During the flight, the cargo turns out to be a multitude of virtually unstoppable killer robots.

Plot 
At a corporation's base on the Neptunian moon Triton, mercenaries are setting up a defense perimeter to try to hold off an unstoppable cyborg warrior. The company's CEO E.J. Saggs and chief scientist Dr. Nabel seal themselves inside the control room. The cyborg destroys the soldiers' tank and then attacks a helicopter, which crashes into the control room. The soldiers are killed one by one, until Nabel finally deactivates the cyborg with a remote control. The remaining corporate employees discover that the cyborg was created by Nabel for the company. Saggs takes the remote and reactivates the cyborg, ordering it to kill Nabel.

Meanwhile, John Canyon, one of the last independent "space truckers", drops off his cargo of square pigs at a "truck stop" space station, but becomes embroiled in a brawl with the trucking company head, Keller, who is sucked out into space. He and his two passengers—Cindy, a waitress who has promised to marry him in exchange for a ride to Earth to see her mother, and Mike, an up-and-coming trucker working for the company—take on a deal to transport alleged sex dolls to Earth. Chased by police investigating Keller's death, John takes his rig into the "scum zone", a region controlled by pirates. The rig takes damage, leaving them adrift; they are soon captured by the pirate ship Regalia, commanded by the company-hating Captain Macanudo. Cindy agrees to have sex with him if he would take the cargo and let them go.

The captain is revealed to be Nabel, who rebuilt his grievously injured body and went into piracy as revenge against Saggs for betraying him. The cargo that John's rig is carrying is in fact a full supply of the cyborg warriors Nabel designed and built for Saggs' company. One of the cyborgs activates, kills most of the crew, and severely damages the ship. John, Cindy and Mike take their rig and escape as the Regalia explodes. As they make their way back to Earth, John and Mike find a mortally wounded Macanudo in the hold, who reveals the true nature of the cargo to them. John releases Cindy from any obligation of marrying him, and tells her and Mike to take the escape pod while he releases the cargo in the atmosphere, where it will burn up on re-entry. Cindy and Mike land safely, but the rig is unable to return to space and explodes in the sky; however, John is able to safely escape before the explosion.

John, Cindy and Mike go to the hospital to see Cindy's mother, who became sick twenty years earlier and was frozen until a cure was found; John is smitten with her at first sight. Meanwhile, Saggs—now President of Earth after the government was privatized—visits John, Cindy and Mike in the hospital, where he offers John a new rig and gives the trio a suitcase full of money to keep them quiet about his cyborg invasion plan. John agrees to the deal, but Mike angrily throws the suitcase out the window. Below, Saggs re-enters his presidential limousine; having planted a bomb in the suitcase, he triggers the detonator just as the suitcase lands on his limousine's roof, killing him. With Saggs dead and Earth safe, Mike, Cindy, John and Cindy's mother blast off in their brand new rig.

Cast 
 Dennis Hopper as John Canyon
 Debi Mazar as Cindy
 Stephen Dorff as Mike Pucci
 Charles Dance as Dr. Nabel / Captain Macanudo
 George Wendt as Keller
 Vernon Wells as Mr. Cutt
 Barbara Crampton as Carol
 Shane Rimmer as Commander E.J. Saggs
 Olwen Fouéré as Building Commander
 Pat Laffan as "Scummy"
 Birdy Sweeney as "Mr. Zesty"
 Sandra Dickinson as "Bitchin' Betty"
 Graeme Wilkinson as Jackie
 Sean Lawlor as Mel

Production
The film was inspired by writers Stuart Gordon and Ted Mann's boyhood love of space exploration as well as exploring how little would ultimately change with colonization of other planets with mankind encountering "the same old corporate greed, graft and corruption everyone thought they left behind on earth...". Charles Dance accepted the role "for the sheer fun of it." Calling it one of the most entertaining scripts he'd been offered in years and relishing the opportunity to play inherently silly material completely straight. 

The film was shot in Ireland to exploit tax breaks and local resources, but there were no special effects facilities in Ireland to produce the elaborate effects work needed for the production The 22,000 acre premises of a disused builders' merchant on the Sandyford industrial estate, located outside Dublin, to be taken over and converted into a vast special effects facility headed by visual effects supervisors Brian Johnson and Paul Gentry, who needed to hire scores of model makers, plasterers, carpenters, motion-control camera operators and others as well as supply them with the needed resources.

The film was also involved in a defamation suit between Dennis Hopper and Rip Torn where Hopper publicly stated Torn pulled a knife on him on the set of Easy Rider back in the 1960s. Hopper's representatives tried to settle the defamation suit by floating the offer of a supporting role in Space Truckers, which Torn's representatives refused.

Reception 
 
Space Truckers was poorly received by critics, with the review aggregator Rotten Tomatoes rating the film at 15%, based on 13 reviews. It was also a box office bomb, earning less than $2 million against a $25+ million budget, partly due to the fact that despite festival play, it never received a United States theatrical release, instead being solicited directly to cable television and home video instead.

Other reviews 
 Empire June 1997 p. 46 (UK) review (by Kim Newman)
 Film Review June 1997 p. 21 (UK) review (by James Cameron-Wilson)
 Total Film June 1997 p. 100 (UK) review (by Anthony Brown)
 SFX May 1998 p. 109, 110 (by Sarah Mainprize).
 SFX December 1997 p. 98, 99 (by Guy Haley).
 SFX June 1997 p. 79 (by Anthony Brown).

References

External links 
 
 
  Space Truckers w/Jason O'Mara Jasonomara.net

1996 films
1990s science fiction comedy-drama films
1990s road comedy-drama films
1990s satirical films
British road comedy-drama films
British satirical films
British science fiction comedy-drama films
American science fiction comedy-drama films
American road comedy-drama films
American satirical films
American space adventure films
English-language Irish films
1990s English-language films
Films directed by Stuart Gordon
Films shot in the Republic of Ireland
Films scored by Colin Towns
Films set on spacecraft
Trucker films
Cyborg films
Fiction set on Triton (moon)
1990s American films
1990s British films